Istituto di Genetica Vegetale (IGV) is a research network om Plant Genetics and Breeding within the Italian Consiglio Nazionale delle Ricerche (National Research Council). IGV is headquartered in Bari and has four different Divisions in Portici, Palermo, Florence and Perugia. IGV started its activities in November 2002.

IGV represents the merger of five former Institutes:
Germplasm Institute – Bari 
Institute of Forest Tree Breeding - Florence
Research Institute of Ornamental and Vegetable Plant Breeding -Portici 
Research Institute for Citrus Genetics, Palermo 
Research Institute for Grass and Fodder Crop Breeding - Perugia

Research Lines
IVG pays particular attention to specific sectors of the plant genetic resources such as local agro-ecotypes, ecotypes threatened of extinction, wild relatives of the cultivated plants, wild species used by man for several purposes, species that can be potentially exploited for the extraction of bio-active or technological products, and finally the model species. Currently the Bari Section  preserves around 80.000 samples belonging to more than 40 genera and about 600 species. Numerous accessions have been acquired through the exchange with other Institutions. Altogether from 1972 over 80.000 samples have been distributed all over the world.

Small data banks also exist on specific aspects, such as the protein quality and antinutritional factors (in wheat, beans, faba bean, lentil, cowpea, resistance to biotic stress (in wheat and faba bean), plant characters (in wheat and chickpea), rare, very rare and endemic angiosperm Italian species.

From a general point of view the results and acquired experience have allowed the Section in Bari to become a reference of excellence in the national and international scientific community in the field of the safeguard of plant biodiversity. This has favoured the start of operational contacts with several public and private subjects interested in the exploitation of plant genetic resources.

Wheat lines have been detected which contain a high level of proteins and lines characterized by protein components associated to pasta-making quality.

Seed Bank
The Bari Section has possesses cold rooms for the maintenance of seeds: for long storage seeds are kept at -20 °C; for short-medium term conservation, 0 °C and 30% of relative humidity are used.

Bari has developed collaborations with analogous national (Faculty of Agriculture, Institutes of the CNR, MiPAF, ENEA, etc.) and international (FAO, IPGRI, IITA, ICARDA, IPK, etc.) Institutions.

Bioinformatics
In the last years, IGV has begun the development of a bioinformatics activity which has seen the creation of the web Data base of the accessions from the seed bank and of some of the results of the research activity. Those data bases are accessible on line in the official website.

Divisions

Florence

The main research activities at the Florence division are the analysis of the genetic structure and the variability within and between populations of forest tree species. Florence can be now considered one of the leader at National and International level as it has been one of the first to set up and use the new biotechnologies to develop a lot of different biochemical and DNAmarkers. Florence has given a fundamental and sometimes original contribution to the increase of the knowledge in forest topics:
 defining the level and the distribution of the genetic resources;
 exploring the phylogenetic relationships between different species;
 studying mechanisms involved in the maintenance of the genetic variability and potential adaptability.

Palermo
The research activities at the Palermo division range over all the fields of Citrus genetics. Main topics are:
 Scion and rootstock improvement by conventional (hybridation and clonal selection) and biotechnological (protoplast culture, tissue culture, somatic embryogenesis) methods
 Selection of useful genotypes
 Molecular analysis and characterization of regenerated plants
 Tissue culture for sanitation
 Gene identification and isolation
 Genetic transformation
 Studies on the pharmacological and alimentary properties
 Preservation and enhancement of local germplasm
 Evaluation of plants suitable for ornamental use

The main goal of the Palermo division is to obtain and select superior scion varieties, as compared to the ones currently used and improved rootstocks that will provide growers with alternative choices for any location. The strategy is to enhance the genetic variability in order to select new individuals.

Perugia
In the last five to eight years, the Perugia division gained new researchers, with new investigated species typical of the Umbria region where the division is operating and with new and more current research lines. The research on tree species such as Olive (Olea europaea) and Cherry (Prunus avium) was started in close collaboration with the regional public institutions focusing on two main objectives:
 production of fingerprints of Italian varieties and
 development of a database of molecular markers used in the perspective to study the association between candidate genes and/or anonymous molecular markers and traits of agronomic interest.

In the last years a research line on truffle received a strong development, considering that Umbria is one of the very few regions that can boast appreciable productions of all the most important and prestigious species.

Portici

Since the beginning, the Portici division has been researching the genetic improvement of several vegetable crops by conventional and biotechnological approaches. Most of the research projects are focused on ornamental and vegetable crops of economic interest for Southern Italian agricultural areas, such as tomato, potato, artichoke, tobacco. The main research objectives are designed at the developing and maintaining the genetic variability, speeding up the selection of superior genotypes, understanding the genetic control of reproduction and its association with yield improvement, increasing quality and tolerance to biotic and abiotic stress, through bio-molecular techniques, chromosomal manipulation and cell and tissue culture.

The current research activities at Portici are focused on:
 Identification, characterization and genetic transfer of genes involved in the adaptation and tolerance to environmental stress conditions (heat, cold, drought and salt) in potato and tomato and the model species Arabidopsis;
 Development and use of molecular markers for varietal identification and assisted selection;
 Genetic control and manipulation of sexual reproduction, by studying mutants and identifying key genes;
 Innovative genetic-molecular approaches to improve and exploit local tomato varieties;
 Introgression of useful genes (genes for biotic and abiotic constraints, genes for quality) from wild potato species into potato, rose, tomato, by somatic hybridization and interspecific crossing schemes;
 Valorization of genetic resources of vegetable, ornamental and medicinal plants, typical of Southern Italy and Meditterrean areas;
 Development of an efficient technology of plastid transformation and expression of useful genes for products destined for agro- and pharmaceutical industries.

References

External links
 Official website
 www.cnr.it , homepage of the CNR website. 

Research institutes in Italy